Mental disability may refer to:

 Developmental disability, a chronic condition due to mental or physical impairments arising before adulthood
 Disabilities affecting intellectual abilities, medical conditions affecting cognitive ability including:
 Intellectual disability, also known as general learning disability, a generalized neurodevelopmental disorder 
 Learning disability, where a person has difficulty learning in a typical manner
 Mental disorder, also called mental illness or psychiatric disorder, a behavioral or mental pattern that causes impairment of personal functioning
 Neurodevelopmental disorder, a disorder of brain function 
Emotional and behavioral disorders, a disability classification used in educational settings

See also 
 Mental health
 Physical disability